Osaka Popstar and the American Legends of Punk is the first, and so far only, album released by Osaka Popstar. The title references the fact that the band includes members of legendary punk bands such as The Misfits, Ramones, Black Flag and The Voidoids.

The CD came with a DVD that included music videos for "Wicked World" and "Insects".

Track listing
 "Wicked World" (Daniel Johnston) – 2:58,
 "Astro Boy" (Donald Rockwell, Tatsuo Takai) – 1:30
 "Sailor Moon" (Andy Heyward, Tetsuya Komoro, Kanako Oda) – 1:11
 "Man of Constant Sorrow" (Traditional, arranged by John Cafiero) – 3:20
 "Insects" (Davis Aronin, Carl Brown Jerron Cool, Keisha Dotson, Brenda Garcia, Inisinna, Kids Of Widney High, Michael Monagan) – 2:06
 "I Live Off You" (Marianne Elliot, aka Poly Styrene) – 1:50
 "Xmas Intro (That Almost Wasn't)" (Ray Carter) – 0:10
 "The Christmas That Almost Wasn't" (Carter, Paul Tripp) – 1:38
 "Love Comes in Spurts" (Richard Hell) – 1:53
 "Blank Generation" (Hell) – 2:47
 "Monsters" (Cafiero) – 2:52
 "Where's the Cap'n?" (Cafiero) – 2:25
 "Shaolin Monkeys" (Cafiero) – 2:58

Personnel
 John Cafiero – vocals
 Jerry Only – bass
 Dez Cadena – lead guitar
 Ivan Julian – rhythm guitar
 Marky Ramone – drums

Cover songs
Among the songs on the album are cover versions of the title tracks from the anime series Astro Boy and Sailor Moon, and the Rossano Brazzi film The Christmas That Almost Wasn't.

2006 debut albums
Rykodisc albums